Identity Card may refer to:

 An identity document
List of national identity card policies by country
 Identity Card (2010 film), a Czech film
 Identity Card (2014 film), an Indian film
 "Identity Card", a song by Kissing the Pink (KTP) from Certain Things Are Likely

See also